The 1934–35 season was the 8th season of competitive football in the British Mandate for Palestine under the Eretz Israel Football Association and the 3rd under the Arab Palestine Sports Federation.

IFA Competitions

1934–35 Palestine League

The competition began in December 1934, the EIFA decided to abandon the competition in early March 1935.

1935 Palestine Cup

Both Maccabi Tel Aviv and Hapoel Tel Aviv opted to forfeit their matches. Maccabi Avshalom Petah Tikva and Hakoah Tel Aviv took advantage of this and made it to the final, the former winning by a single goal.

Notable events

1935 Maccabiah Games
 Six teams took part in the football tournament of the 1935 Maccabiah Games: Eretz Israel, Poland, Lithuania, England, Germany and Romania. The tournament was won by Romania, with Germany taking second place and Eretz Israel the third.

References